The 1993 CONCACAF Gold Cup was the second edition of the Gold Cup, the soccer championship of North America, Central America and the Caribbean (CONCACAF).

The format of the tournament stayed the same as in 1991: eight teams were broken up into two groups of four, with the top two in each group advancing to the semifinals. It was the first Gold Cup to be co-hosted; Group A was held in the United States (Dallas), and Group B in Mexico (Mexico City). The tournament was won by Mexico, who beat the US 4–0 in the final.

Qualified teams

Venues

Squads

The 8 national teams involved in the tournament were required to register a squad of 20 players; only players in these squads were eligible to take part in the tournament.

Group stage

Group A

Group B

Knockout stage

Bracket

Semi-finals

Third place match

Costa Rica and Jamaica shared the third place.

Final

Statistics

Goalscorers
11 goals
 Zague
5 goals
 Luis Miguel Salvador
4 goals
 Eduardo Bennett
3 goals

 Juan Arnoldo Cayasso
 Octavio Mora

2 goals

 Roy Myers
 Paul Davis
 Devon Jarrett
 Ignacio Ambríz
 Jorge Rodriguez
 Eric Wynalda

1 goal

 Geoff Aunger
 Alex Bunbury
 Nick Dasovic
 Floyd Guthrie
 Giovanni Gayle
 Alex Pineda Chacón
 Walter Boyd
 Hector Wright
 Thierry Fondelot
 Georges Gertrude
 Thierry Tinmar
 Guillermo Cantú
 Juan Hernández
 Ramón Ramírez
 Jesús Julio
 Víctor Mendieta
 Percibal Piggott
 Thomas Dooley
 Cle Kooiman
 Alexi Lalas

Own goals

 Javier Delgado for Mexico
 Desmond Armstrong for Mexico

Awards

References

External links
Lineups/Squads

 
Gold Cup
CONCACAF Gold Cup 1993
1993
Concacaf Gold Cup
Concacaf Gold Cup
CONCACAF Gold Cup tournaments